The Al Mezan Center for Human Rights or Al Mezan (ميزان) is a non-governmental organization based in the Jabalia Palestinian refugee camp in the Gaza Strip. Its declared goals are: To promote and protect human rights in the OPT and especially in the Gaza Strip with a focus on economic, social and cultural rights (ESCR); to work towards the realization of Palestinians’ individual and collective human rights, including the right to self-determination through the channels of international law; to enhance democracy and citizen participation in the OPT and press towards good governance that respects human rights. The organization has a special consultative status in the United Nations.

Name 

Mezan (ميزان) is Arabic for balance or scales, as well as justice and equity.

Activities
The Al Mezan Center for Human Rights states it is dedicated to securing a permanent foundation for the protection of human rights in the Gaza Strip. Although it claims its long term aim is to foster development of full economic, social, and cultural rights, during the current heightened conflict between Israelis and Palestinians the Al Mezan Center has focused on what it alleges are accelerating violations of basic civil rights and human rights, primarily by the Israeli Defense Forces.

In the role of human rights monitor, the Al Mezan Center documents alleged human rights violations, such as disproportionate military attacks on civilian areas that result in widespread civilian casualties, the practice of imprisonment without trial, political assassination, and official policies condoning brutality and torture that undermine development of civil society.  The center also provides legal aid, advocacy, and capacity-building services and resources and conducts educational activities to raise awareness in the local community about basic human rights, democracy, and the importance of international humanitarian relief.

Funding
The organization's core donors are:
 Netherlands Representative Office
 Swiss Agency for Development and Cooperation (SDC)
 Kerkinactie/ Global Ministries
 International Commission of Jurists- Sweden

Individual project donors are:
 Mertz Gilmore Foundation
 The French Consulate (funded the library in 2002–2003)
 The Ford Foundation

Affiliations
The organization is a member of the following networks and committees:
 Economic, Social and Cultural Rights Network (ESCR Network)
 Palestinian Non-Governmental Organizations Network (PNGO)
 Coalition for Accountability and Integrity
 Middle East and North Africa Network to Stop the Use of Children as soldiers
 Habitat International Coalition – Housing and Land Rights Network
 MENA Network to Stop the Proliferation and Misuse of Small Arms & Light Weapons

Reports of the center 
Al Mezan Center for Human Rights issued a report about the Gaza Strip condemning Israel's violations against the fishermen in Gaza Sea. On 21 February 2017, Israeli naval forces opened gunfire at a Palestinian fishing boat off the coast of Al Waha, North Gaza. As a consequence, one of the fishermen, Mohammed Bakr, was shot in the back; the five fishermen on board were then withdrawn to an unknown location and their boat was confiscated. They are residents of Al-Shate' refugee camp and are identified as: Mohammed Omran Sabri Bakr, 23; Abdullah Sabri Bakr, 19; Mahmoud Sabri Bakr, 17; Omar Mohammed Najeeb Bakr, 25; and Thabet Mohammed Bakr, 21. But before detaining them for nearly 24 hours, the Israeli forces forced them to strip their clothes and jump into the water to swim to arrest at the navy vessel – though the weather was very cold. In spite of Mohammed's injury in his hand, he was forced to do as the others were doing. While they were on board the navy vessel, Mohammed was handcuffed, blindfolded and struck with a rifle butt. As the report mentioned, the 1993 Oslo Accords declared that a permitted fishing zone for fishermen in Gaza reaches to 20 nautical miles (nm); however, it was reduced to 12 nm by 2002 and to six nm by 2006. During the recent years, it has sometimes been decreased to three nm since Gaza has been considered as an enemy entity for Israel. According to the report, since 2000, the Israeli forces have killed six fishermen, injured 115, detained 613 fishermen and seized 146 boats and pieces of equipment, which resulted in deterioration in the Palestinian fishing sector on addition to thousands of jobs linked to this sector. Within the fishermen's syndicate 3,600 fishermen are registered; but less than 1,500  of these fishermen are active within their profession, so all their members have lived below the poverty line, as clarified in the report.

References

External links
 Al Mezan Center for Human Rights

Human rights organizations based in the State of Palestine
Human rights in the Gaza Strip
Organizations established in 1999
Non-profit organizations based in the State of Palestine